Pappi Corsicato (born 12 June 1960) is an Italian film director and screenwriter.

Selected filmography
 Libera (1993)
 Black Holes (1995)
 The Vesuvians (1997)
 Chimera (2001)
 The Seed of Discord (2008)
Armando Testa - Povero ma moderno (2009)
Another Woman's Face (2012)
Julian Schnabel: A Private Portrait (2017)
Pompeii: Sin City (2021)

References

External links

1960 births
Living people
Italian film directors
Italian screenwriters
Film people from Naples
Nastro d'Argento winners
Ciak d'oro winners
Italian male screenwriters